Sadasiva Raya (1542–1570) was a ruler of the Vijayanagara Empire, a powerful Southern Indian empire based in the Deccan region in the 16th century India. 
When the Vijayanagara ruler Achyuta Raya, who was the younger brother of Krishnadevaraya, died in AD 1542, his son, Venkata I    (Venkata Raya or Venkatadri Raya), succeeded him. He was killed six months later. Sadasiva Raya, who was the nephew (sister-in-law's son) of Achyuta Raya became king according to the laws of Aliya Santana which was prevalent among the Tuluvas. Sadasiva Raya alone with his minister Rama Raya, who restored the  Vijayanagara empire's power which had diminished after the rule of Krishna Deva Raya.The strategy was to play the Deccan Sultanates against each other by first allying with one and then another.

Notes

External links
Battle of Talikota
Hampi

People of the Vijayanagara Empire
16th-century Indian monarchs
Tulu people
Indian Hindus
Hindu monarchs
1569 deaths
1542 in India
1542 births